The KG College of Arts and Science  (KG-CAS), in Saravanampatti, Coimbatore, India, was founded in 2005 at Coimbatore, India. It is sponsored by KG Information Systems (KGiSL) through the KGiSL Trust.

The college provides education at the undergraduate and post-graduate level, focusing on meeting the requirements for all IT professionals.

External links
 
KG College of Arts and Science

Related links
 Dr G Bakthavathsalam Academic Scholarship Foundation
 KGISL - IT services provider
 KGiSL Institute of Information Management

Universities and colleges in Coimbatore